Furnace Island, or simply Furnace (officially known by its Irish name Fornais), is one of the inhabited South Connemara Islands of County Galway, in Ireland. It is connected to the mainland by a bridge to the island Lettermullan.

See also 

 Ceantar na nOileán

References and further reading

References

Islands of County Galway